The fourth and final season of My Name Is Earl originally aired from September 25, 2008 to May 14, 2009 on NBC.

The season ended with a cliff-hanger that was to be resolved in season 5, however, the series was cancelled unexpectedly and so it remains unresolved.

Episodes
Season four began on September 25, 2008. Greg Garcia said in a press interview that Season 4 would have Earl get back to doing things on the list since season 3 had Earl go through prison, coma, and relationship.

References

My Name Is Earl
2008 American television seasons
2009 American television seasons